The rebound effect, or rebound phenomenon, is the emergence or re-emergence of symptoms that were either absent or controlled while taking a medication, but appear when that same medication is discontinued, or reduced in dosage. In the case of re-emergence, the severity of the symptoms is often worse than pretreatment levels.

Definition
The rebound effect, or pharmaceutical rebound phenomenon, is the emergence or re-emergence of symptoms that were either absent or controlled while taking a medication, but appear when that same medication is discontinued, or reduced in dosage. In the case of re-emergence, the severity of the symptoms is often worse than pretreatment levels.

Examples

Sedative hypnotics
Rebound insomnia is insomnia that occurs following discontinuation of sedative substances taken to relieve primary insomnia. Regular use of these substances can cause a person to become dependent on its effects in order to fall asleep. Therefore, when a person has stopped taking the medication and is 'rebounding' from its effects, they may experience insomnia as a symptom of withdrawal. Occasionally, this insomnia may be worse than the insomnia the drug was intended to treat. Common medicines known to cause this problem are eszopiclone, zolpidem, and anxiolytics such as benzodiazepines and which are prescribed to people having difficulties falling or staying asleep.

Rebound depression may appear to arise in patients previously free of such an illness.

Daytime rebound effects of anxiety, metallic taste, perceptual disturbances which are typical benzodiazepine withdrawal symptoms can occur the next day after a short-acting benzodiazepine hypnotic wears off. Rebound phenomena do not necessarily only occur on discontinuation of a prescribed dosage. Another example is early morning rebound insomnia which may occur when a rapidly eliminated hypnotic wears off which leads to rebounding awakeness forcing the person to become wide awake before he or she has had a full night's sleep. One drug which seems to be commonly associated with these problems is triazolam, due to its high potency and ultra short half life, but these effects can occur with other short-acting hypnotic drugs. Quazepam, due to its selectivity for type1 benzodiazepine receptors and long half-life, does not cause daytime anxiety rebound effects during treatment, showing that half-life is very important for determining whether a nighttime hypnotic will cause next-day rebound withdrawal effects or not. Daytime rebound effects are not necessarily mild but can sometimes produce quite marked psychiatric and psychological disturbances.

Stimulants
Rebound effects from stimulants such as methylphenidate or dextroamphetamine include stimulant psychosis, depression and a return of ADHD symptoms but in a temporarily exaggerated form. Up to a third of ADHD children experience a rebound effect when methylphenidate is withdrawn.

Antidepressants
Many antidepressants, including SSRIs, can cause rebound depression, panic attacks, anxiety, and insomnia when discontinued.

Antipsychotics

Sudden and severe emergence  or re-emergence of psychosis may appear when antipsychotics are switched or discontinued too rapidly.

Alpha-2 adrenergic agents
Rebound hypertension, above pre-treatment level, was observed after clonidine, and guanfacine discontinuation.

Continuous usage of topical decongestants (nasal sprays) can lead to constant nasal congestion, known as rhinitis medicamentosa.

Other medications

Another example of pharmaceutical rebound is a rebound headache from painkillers when the dose is lowered, the medication wears off, or the drug is abruptly discontinued.

In 2022, reports of viral RNA and symptom rebound in people with COVID-19 treated with Paxlovid were published. In May, CDC even issued a health alert informing physicians about "Paxlovid rebounds", which received attention when US president Joe Biden experienced a rebound. The cause of the rebound is unclear however, since around a third of people with COVID-19 experience a symptom rebound regardless of treatment.

Abrupt withdrawal of highly potent corticosteroids, such as clobetasol for psoriasis can cause a much more severe case of the psoriasis to develop. Therefore, withdrawal should be gradual, until very little actual medication is being applied.

See also
Disuse supersensitivity
Supersensitivity psychosis
Physical dependence
Rebound headache
Drug withdrawal
Unintended consequences

References

Clinical pharmacology
Psychiatric diagnosis